Afghanistan Blizzard was a fierce blizzard that struck Afghanistan on the 10th of January 2008.
Temperatures fell to a low of -30 C, with up to 180 centimeters of snow in the more mountainous regions, killing at least 926 people. It was the third deadliest blizzard in history.
Aid organizations and foreign troops distributed several tons of clothing, blankets, food and fuel in provinces throughout the country and in remote, mountainous villages. The hospitals performed frostbite amputations on at least 100 people across the country, as many walked barefoot in the freezing cold mud and snow.
The weather also claimed more than 100,000 sheep and goats, and nearly 315,000 cattle died.

References 

2008 natural disasters
Blizzards in Afghanistan
Afghanistan Blizzard, 2008
Afghanistan Blizzard, 2008
Blizzard 2008
History of Afghanistan (1992–present)
February 2008 events in Asia
2008 disasters in Afghanistan